Gidajam is a village in Rowthulapudi Mandal, Kakinada district in the state of Andhra Pradesh in India.

Geography 

Demographics 
 India census, Gidajam Village had a population of 2,853, out of which 1394 were male and 1459 were female. Population of children below 6 years of age were 343. The literacy rate of the village is 54.69%.

References 

Villages in Rowthulapudi mandal